Louis P. Campanelli (August 10, 1938 – January 31, 2023) was an American basketball coach. He served as head coach at James Madison University from 1972 to 1985 and the University of California, Berkeley from 1986 to 1993.

Early life
Campanelli was born on August 10, 1938, in Elizabeth, New Jersey. He graduated from Montclair State University.

Coaching career

James Madison
Campanelli was head coach at James Madison for 13 years (1972–85) where he guided the Dukes to a record of 238–118 and five NCAA Tournament appearances. His 21-year head coaching record stands at 361–226 (.615).

California
Campanelli played a significant role in Pac-10 men's basketball, having served as head basketball coach at California for eight years, from 1985 to 1993. He compiled a record of 123–108 (.532) and led the Bears to post-season play on four occasions.  In his first season, he led Cal to the 1986 National Invitation Tournament, the school's first postseason bid of any kind since 1960. In 1990, he led the Bears to their first NCAA Tournament in 30 years.

Campanelli was abruptly fired on February 8, 1993 with ten games to go in the 1992–93 season. Athletic director Bob Bockrath inadvertently heard Campanelli give profanity-laced lectures to his players following losses to Arizona State and Arizona. Several players, including freshman Jason Kidd,  had complained to Bockrath about his abrasive coaching style, but Bockrath said he had no idea just how "beaten down" the players had been until then.

Later career
After his college coaching career, Campanelli also coached one year in the Japan Pro League, spent several years as an advance scout for the National Basketball Association's Cleveland Cavaliers and New Jersey Nets, and served as Commissioner of Pac 10 Officiating.

Campenelli coached the junior varsity basketball team at Campolindo High School in Moraga, California, starting as a volunteer assistant.

Personal life and death
Campanelli grew up in Springfield, New Jersey.  He graduated from Montclair State University, where he also earned his master's degree.  He resided in Livermore, California.

Campanelli died on January 31, 2023, at the age of 84.

Book
In 2015, Campanelli wrote a book titled Dare to Dream: How James Madison University Became Coed and Shocked the Basketball World, about his dream of becoming a college basketball coach and his accomplishment of growing the all-girl Madison college athletics program into a successful men's NCAA basketball team.

Head coaching record

*Campanelli was fired in February 1993; California credits the first 17 games of the regular season to Campanelli.

References

1938 births
2023 deaths
Basketball coaches from California
Basketball coaches from New Jersey
California Golden Bears men's basketball coaches
James Madison Dukes men's basketball coaches
Montclair State University alumni
People from Livermore, California
People from Springfield Township, Union County, New Jersey
Sportspeople from Union County, New Jersey